Henry Wilde may refer to:

Henry Tingle Wilde (1872–1912), Chief Officer on the RMS Titanic
Henry Wilde (engineer) (1833–1919), inventor of the self-energising dynamo